The Royal Society of Portrait Painters is a charity based at Carlton House Terrace, SW1, London that promotes the practice and appreciation of portraiture art.

Its Annual Exhibition of portraiture is held at Mall Galleries, and it runs a commissions service to help those wanting a portrait throughout the year. Activities include artist Prizes, Awards, demonstrations, workshops, debates and talks.

The Society is a member of the Federation of British Artists.

History

The Royal Society of Portrait Painters was founded in 1891 by the leading portrait painters of the day. Being dissatisfied with the selection policies of the Royal Academy for its annual exhibition in London, they formed a new body to be concerned solely with portrait painting.

The first exhibition of the society was held in 1891. The catalogue of that exhibition shows that its committee then consisted of Archibald Stuart-Wortley (Chairman), Hon. John Collier, Arthur Hacker, G. P. Jacomb-Hood, S.J. Solomon, James Jebusa Shannon and Hubert Vos.  The other members listed were Percy Bigland, C. A. Furse, Glazebrook, John McLure Hamilton, Heywood Hardy, Hubert von Herkomer, Henry J. Hudson, Louise Jopling, T. B. Kennington, W. Llewellyn, W. M. Loudan, Arthur Melville, Anna Lea Merritt, F. M. Skipworth, Mrs Annie Swynnerton, W. R. Symonds, Mary Waller, Edwin A. Ward, Leslie Ward (better known as "Spy"), and T. Blake Wirgman.

Other early members included Sir John Everett Millais, George Frederick Watts, John Singer Sargent, Augustus John and James McNeill Whistler. Women were eligible for membership from the start.

At the Coronation Exhibition of 1911, which marked its 20th anniversary, it was announced that King George V had conferred on the society the status of a Royal Society, and it has been known as the Royal Society of Portrait Painters since then.

The Times said on 22 April 2006:

Activities

Portrait Commissions Service

To encourage the genre of portrait painting, they offer a portrait commissions service.

Annual Exhibition 

The Society holds an Annual Exhibition, which takes place every year at the Mall Galleries, The Mall, by Trafalgar Square, London.

A major showcase for some 200 recent portraits it is the largest contemporary portrait exhibition in the UK. It is formed by a cohort of work by distinguished members alongside works by non-member artists who have successfully competed to be included in the show. Unlike other shows, the works are entirely selected by portrait painters. The exhibition aims to include the best of a wide variety of styles in painted and drawn media.

Prizes and Awards

Many prizes are awarded via the Annual Exhibition. These include The William Lock Portrait Prize worth £20,000,the Ondaatje Prize for Portraiture, the Prince of Wales Award for Portrait Drawing, the Burke's Peerage Foundation Prize and the de Laszlo Foundation Prize, and the Smallwood Architects Prize.

Learning

The Society also holds portrait demonstrations, workshops, talks and tours.

Collections

The People's Portrait Collection

The People's Portraits Collection owned by the society was founded in 2000 as a millennial exhibition. The idea was to represent ordinary people from all walks of life, and thereby offer a picture of the United Kingdom as it moved from the 20th century into the 21st.  Each portrait is donated by a Member and Members continue to add to this collection.

The Collection has been housed at Girton College (one of the 31 constituent colleges of the University of Cambridge) since 2002 as a long-term loan, and is open to the public every day.

Membership

Members

 Alastair Adams PPRP (Hon Archivist, Treasurer)
 Frances Bell RP
 Jane Bond RP NEAC
 Jason Bowyer RP PPNEAC
 Paul Brason RP
 Keith Breeden RP
 Peter Brown RP NEAC PS ROI Hon. RBA
 George Bruce (Past President)
 David Caldwell RP
 Tom Coates RP PPNEAC PPPS RWS
 David Cobley RP NEAC RWA
 Anthony Connolly RP (President)
 Saied Dai RP NEAC
 Sam Dalby RP
 Simon Davis VPRP RBSA (Hon Secretary)
 Frederick Deane RP
 Andrew Festing PPRP MBE
 Richard Foster PRP (Past President)
 David Graham RP
 Valeriy Gridnev RP PS ROI
 Herbert James Gunn RA RP (Past President)
 Robin-Lee Hall (Past President)
 James Hague RP
 Geoffrey Hayzer RP
 Emma Hopkins RP
 Sheldon Hutchinson RP
 Andrew James RP 
 Brendan Kelly RP
 Peter Kuhfeld RP NEAC
 June Mendoza AO OBE RP ROI Hon. SWA
 Anthony Morris RP NEAC
 Tom Phillips RA Hon. RP
 Anastasia Pollard RP
 David Poole PPRP ARCA
 Mark Roscoe RP
 Susan Ryder RP NEAC
 Tai-Shan Schierenberg Hon. RP
 Melissa Scott-Miller RP NEAC 
 Stephen Shankland RP
 Jeff Stultiens RP
 Benjamin Sullivan RP NEAC
 Jason Sullivan RP
 Michael Taylor RP
 Daphne Todd OBE PPRP NEAC
 Jason Walker RP
 John Walton RP
 Emma Wesley RP
 Toby Wiggins RP 
 Antony Williams RP PS NEAC
 John Wonnacott Hon. RP CBE
 Neale Worley RP NEAC
 Robbie Wraith RP
 Martin Yeoman RP NEAC

References

External links
Website of the Royal Society of Portrait Painters

 
1891 establishments in England
Art societies
Charities based in London
Organisations based in the City of Westminster